Daniel Bracy Young (born November 3, 1971) is a former professional baseball pitcher. He appeared in four games in Major League Baseball for the Chicago Cubs in 2000.

Young was drafted by the Houston Astros in the 83rd round of the 1990 Major League Baseball Draft.

Young had a very brief career in the major leagues, pitching in only four games for the Chicago Cubs during the 2000 season. His most memorable outing was likely his major league debut on March 30, 2000 against the New York Mets at the Tokyo Dome in Tokyo, Japan. In that contest, Young was summoned to pitch the top of the 11th inning with the goal of preserving a 1–1 tie. He quickly recorded the first two outs, but then loaded the bases before surrendering a grand slam home run to the Mets' Benny Agbayani. The four runs allowed proved to be the margin of victory, as the Cubs failed to score in the bottom of the inning and fell to the Mets 5-1.

References

External links

Major League Baseball pitchers
Chicago Cubs players
Gulf Coast Astros players
Asheville Tourists players
Augusta GreenJackets players
Salem Buccaneers players
Lynchburg Hillcats players
Daytona Cubs players
West Tennessee Diamond Jaxx players
Iowa Cubs players
Baseball players from Tennessee
1971 births
Living people
People from Smyrna, Tennessee
African-American baseball players